Double House may refer to:

Places
Double House, Utrecht, Netherlands
McColloch-Weatherhogg Double House, Indiana, United States
C.H. Baker Double House, Iowa, United States
Walter M. Bartlett Double House, Iowa, United States
F.E. Haley Double House, Iowa, United States
Daniel T. Newcome Double House, Iowa, United States
Susie P. Turner Double House, Iowa, United States
Merrill Double House, Massachusetts, United States
William Shay Double House, New York, United States
Adams Street Double House, Ohio, United States

Other
Double House (manga), Japanese manga by Nanae Haruno
Alternate term for Double monastery

See also
Duplex (building)